The 4C Entity is a digital rights management (DRM) consortium formed by IBM, Intel, Panasonic and Toshiba that has established and licensed interoperable cryptographic protection mechanisms for removable media technologies. 4C Entity was founded in 1999 when Warner Music approached the companies to develop stronger DRM technologies for the then-novel DVD-Audio format after Intel’s CSS DRM technology was hacked.

The group developed and currently lease the Content Protection for Recordable Media (CPRM) and the Content Protection for Prerecorded Media (CPPM) schemes, which use Media Key Block technology and the Cryptomeria cipher along with audio watermarks. 4C Entity has also written the Content Protection System Architecture (CPSA), which describes how content protection solutions work together and the role of each current technology.

CPPM and CPRM are implemented in SD Cards, DVD-Audio, Flash media, and other digital media formats. Like many DRM technologies, 4C Entity and its products have been criticized, with the Associated Press writing that CPRM “spark[ed] privacy concerns.”

References

External links
The 4C Entity

Consortia in the United States
Digital rights management